St. Paul's Church, Gatten, Shanklin is a parish church in the Church of England located in Shanklin, Isle of Wight.

History

It is an ecclesiastical parish taken out of Sandown in 1876. (fn. 17) The church was built 1880–90, and has an apsidal chancel, a nave with aisles of five bays and a stone tower at the north angle.

The church was designed by the architect C. L. Luck.

St. Paul's Church has the bell from HMS Eurydice (1843), which sank off Dunnose Point and is the subject of a poem by Gerard Manley Hopkins.

Organ

The pipe organ dates from 1882 by the builder Forster and Andrews. A specification of the organ can be found on the National Pipe Organ Register.

References

Church of England church buildings on the Isle of Wight
Grade II listed churches on the Isle of Wight
Shanklin